Bhagyalakshmi Bumper Draw is a 2006 Telugu-language comedy film directed by Nidhi Prasad. It stars Rajendra Prasad, Richard Rishi, and Farjana with music composed by Chakri. The film is produced by Raju and Praveen on Silver Screen Movies banner. It is a remake of the Hindi film Malamaal Weekly (2006).

Plot
The film begins in a village where various characters appear Bullebbai is a lottery ticket agent, Pala Pullayya, the local dairy farmer, Pilli Pentayya, a hoax political leader, Chanti the barber, Varadaraju belongs to a former royal dynasty. Varadaraju takes some loans from Pullayya, in return he accommodates his son Kittu with him and he falls for Pullayya's daughter Bhagyalakshmi. Parallelly, Ranikasula Renuka Rani a tyrant, who suffers the entire village by allowing debts, and her brother Aphis a vagabond aspires to possess Bhagyalakshmi and forcibly engage with her. Meanwhile, Bullebbai realizes that one of the tickets has won the top prize of Rs.1 crore and ploys to obtain it. So, he hosts a dinner for his customers and by elimination, he deduces that the town drunk Yesudas Gotham is the winner and immediately rushes to him. Thereupon, Bullebbai spots Yesudas dead, due to shock and the ticket clutched in his hand. Right now, Bullebbai pries the ticket when Pullayya arrives and Bullebbai lures him by offering a share. Eventually, Kittu also observes it and intimidates them to couple up with Bhagyalakshmi. At present, Bullebbai orders Kittu to throw Yesudas's body into the river but the hard time following they make some mistakes which are noticed by a few villagers. The next day, when Bullebbai calls the lottery office he learns that before dying, Yesudas managed to call them. As well as to his brother Joshua Gotham's family, ex-wife Parvathi and several people to whom he owed money. Here, a tough situation arises to maintain secrecy, so, Bullebbai congregates them into a group of 20 members. After some time, the lottery inspector lands to interview Yesudas. The rest of the story is a humorous confusion drama that how Bullebbai manages to grab the lottery prize?

Cast

 Rajendra Prasad as Bullabbai 
 Richard Rishi as Kittu
 Farjana as Bhagyalakshmi
 Kiran Rathod as Ranikasula Renuka Rani
 K.Nagababu as Lottery Inspector
 Brahmanandam as Joshua Gotham 
 Ali as Yesudasu Gotham
 M. S. Narayana as Varadaraju
 Tanikella Bharani as Paala Pullayya
 Chakri as (cameo appearance)
 Mallikarjuna Rao as Astrologer
 Benarjee as Sarvarayudu
 Venu Madhav as Aphisu
 L.B. Sriram as Barber Chanti
 Kondavalasa as Pilli Pentayya
 Krishna Bhagawan as Daniel
 Gundu Sudarshan
 Kadambari Kiran as Chitti Babu
 Ram Jagan
 Kovai Sarala as Mary Gotham
 Bhuvaneswari as Mallika Sharbat
 Abhinayasri as Parvathi Gotham
 Mumaith Khan as item number
 Seema as Varalakshmi

Soundtrack

Music composed by Chakri.

References

External links
 

2006 films
Telugu remakes of Hindi films
2000s Telugu-language films
Films scored by Chakri